This is a list of the National Register of Historic Places listings in Parker County, Texas.

This is intended to be a complete list of properties and districts listed on the National Register of Historic Places in Parker County, Texas. There are two districts and three individual properties listed on the National Register in the county. One property is both a State Antiquities Landmark (SAL) and a Recorded Texas Historic Landmark (RTHL) and is part of a historic district containing several more RTHLs. Another individually listed property is also an RTHL. An additional property was formerly listed on the National Register. This property remains an SAL.

Current listings

The locations of National Register properties and districts may be seen in a mapping service provided.

|}

Former listing

|}

See also

National Register of Historic Places listings in Texas
Recorded Texas Historic Landmarks in Parker County

References

External links

Parker County, Texas
Parker County
Buildings and structures in Parker County, Texas